Pachabdi Gazi (1924–1997) was a tiger hunter of Bangladesh. He killed 57 tigers, highest in Sundarban.

Early life
Gazi was born in 1924 in  Shara, Satkhira District, East Bengal, British India. He was born into a hunting family, his father was Meher Gazi, a notable tiger hunter who had killed 50 tigers and from who he inherited a muzzle loading double barrel rifle. His grandfather's brother Ismail Gazi was also a hunter. He killed his first tiger when he was 17 in Paikgachha Upazila, Khulna District. The tiger was known as the terror of Golkhali. He was often employed by the Government of Bangladesh to hunt human killing tigers after the Government of Bangladesh banned tiger hunting in 1972.

Career
Gazi worked with the Rangers of the Forest Department. He was appointed a forest guard as his notoriety increased. He used a number of methods to hunt tigers, including killing them from tree tops. He was viewed by honey collectors and others working in the forest as a saviour for protecting them from tigers. He was awarded Tamgha-i-Khidmat in 1968 by the Government of Pakistan. In his career he is estimated to have killed 57-61 tigers including a 12 feet long tiger. His last kill was known as the terror of Talpatti.

Death and legacy
Gazi died in 1997. The book Eighteen tides and a tiger by Anjana Basu has a tiger hunter named Pachabdi Gazi after him.

References

1924 births
1997 deaths
People from Satkhira District
Bangladeshi hunters
Pakistani hunters
Hunters in British India
Bangladeshi conservationists
20th-century Bengalis